Steal (originally titled Riders) is a 2002 action film directed by Gérard Pirès and starring Stephen Dorff, Natasha Henstridge, Bruce Payne, and Steven Berkoff. It was written by Mark Ezra and Pirès.

Plot
Slim (Stephen Dorff), Frank (Steven McCarthy), Otis (Cle Bennett), and Alex (Karen Cliche) are a group of youthful bank robbers who commit their crimes anonymously and in innovative ways involving extreme sports such as skating and snowboarding. The group evades capture from the police, led by "hardboiled cop" Lieutenant Macgruder (Bruce Payne), but an anonymous individual seems to know who they are and threatens to inform the police unless they undertake a robbery for him. Enter the Mob, represented by underworld enforcer Surtayne (Steven Berkoff), who instructs the group to work for them also or they will all be killed. Slim becomes romantically involved with Karen (Natasha Henstridge), a police detective who distrusts Macgruder, and to save her and his friends escape from the threat of the anonymous man and the Mob, Slim concocts a daring robbery.

Cast

Release
Steal received a limited release in the United States on 25 April 2003, grossing $220,994. It went on to gross a total of $7,622,383 worldwide.

Reception
The film has a rating of 29% on the film review website Rotten Tomatoes. BBC's Neil Smith awarded the film 2 out of 5 stars, calling it "gloriously terrible" and accusing it of trying to latch on to the popularity of xXx and Extreme Ops. He found an upside in fight choreography.

References

External links

2002 films
French action thriller films
French crime thriller films
British action thriller films
British crime thriller films
Canadian action thriller films
Canadian crime thriller films
2002 action thriller films
Films directed by Gérard Pirès
Films set in the United States
English-language Canadian films
English-language French films
2000s English-language films
2000s Canadian films
2000s British films
2000s French films